NH 114A may refer to:

 National Highway 114A (India)
 New Hampshire Route 114A, United States